Matthew Lyn Lillard (born January 24, 1970) is an American actor. His early film work includes Chip Sutphin in Serial Mom (1994), Emmanuel "Cereal Killer" Goldstein in Hackers (1995), Stu Macher in Scream (1996), Stevo in SLC Punk! (1998), Brock Hudson in She's All That (1999), and Billy Brubaker in Summer Catch (2001). He played Shaggy Rogers in Scooby-Doo (2002) and its sequel Scooby-Doo 2: Monsters Unleashed (2004), and in animation, he has been the voice of Shaggy since Casey Kasem retired from the role in 2009.

Lillard's later film roles include Jerry Conlaine in Without a Paddle (2004), Dez Howard in The Groomsmen (2006), Joey in Home Run Showdown (2012), and Jack Rusoe in Return to Nim's Island (2013). While much of his work is comedic in nature, Lillard has also given dramatic performances in movies such as The Descendants (2011), Trouble with the Curve (2012), Match (2014), and Twin Peaks: The Return (2017). He made his directorial debut with the coming-of-age drama Fat Kid Rules the World (2012). From 2018 to 2021, Lillard also starred as Dean Boland in the television series Good Girls. Additionally, Lillard cofounded the gaming accessories company "Beadle & Grimm's Pandemonium Warehouse" in 2018.

Early life
Lillard was born in Lansing, Michigan, on January 24, 1970, the son of Paula and Jeffrey Lillard (born 1948), and grew up in Tustin, California. He has a younger sister, Amy, and attended Foothill High School in North Tustin, California. He later attended Fullerton College and then went to the American Academy of Dramatic Arts in Pasadena, California, with fellow actor Paul Rudd. He also attended Circle in the Square Theatre School in New York City.

Career

After high school, Lillard was co-host of a short-lived TV show titled SK8-TV, and afterwards was hired as an extra in Ghoulies 3: Ghoulies Go to College (1991). In 1994, he was cast in the John Waters black comedy Serial Mom. The following year he was cast in five films, including Hackers, a thriller about a group of high school kids who thwart a multimillion-dollar corporate extortion conspiracy. In 1996, he was cast as Stu Macher in the horror film Scream. He also played Stevo in the independent film SLC Punk!, and supporting character Dennis Rafkin in Thirteen Ghosts. He was originally meant to reprise his role of Stu Macher in 2000's Scream 3 but the plans were changed.

Lillard was cast as Norville "Shaggy" Rogers in the 2002 live-action Scooby-Doo film, a role he later reprised in the 2004 sequel Scooby-Doo 2: Monsters Unleashed. When Casey Kasem, who had voiced the character from the show's debut in 1969, retired in 2009 due to declining health, Lillard was chosen as his replacement and voiced Shaggy in the three subsequent animated series, Mystery Incorporated, Be Cool Scooby-Doo!, and Scooby-Doo and Guess Who?, as well as every direct-to-video film since 2010's Scooby-Doo! Abracadabra-Doo. Lillard, however, did not voice Shaggy in the computer-animated 2020 Scooby-Doo reboot Scoob!, with the character instead being voiced by SNL alum Will Forte. Although Lillard was disappointed with the casting decision, he still wished the film good luck.

In 2011, Lillard guest starred on the Fox series House. In 2011, he produced and directed his first feature film, Fat Kid Rules the World, based on the K. L. Going book of the same name. Later that year, he appeared in the comedy-drama film The Descendants. Lillard also reprised the voice role of Shaggy in the crossover episode in the television series Supernatural in 2018.

In 2012, Lillard guest-starred in the Criminal Minds episode "The Apprenticeship". The following year, he played the role of Daniel Frye on the American TV series The Bridge. In 2014, Lillard starred as Peter in the animated film Under Wraps, alongside Brooke Shields and Drake Bell. In 2017, Lillard starred as William Hastings in the third season of Twin Peaks. The next year, he began co-starring as Christina Hendricks's cheating husband on the NBC series Good Girls.

In 2016, Lillard landed the recurring role of FBI undercover agent Luke Goshen in the Amazon Series, Bosch. Later in 2022, Lillard was cast for the upcoming live-action movie adaptation of the Five Nights at Freddy's series as William Afton. In 2023, Lillard guest starred on a season 3 episode of the hit ABC animated television series Chrissy and Abbott. ( Lilard has gone on to guest star on a few episodes of the Chrissy and Abbott spin off series Abbott as a fictional version of himself.), Lilard has been cast as the voice of Mr. Armstrong in the upcoming CBS animated television movie ARMSTRONG alongside his Scooby Doo costar Frank Welker. ( Lilard has executive produced a few episodes of Chrissy and Abbott as an executive producer.)

Personal life
On August 26, 2000, Lillard married Heather Helm, with whom he has three children. They reside in Los Angeles.

In October 2005, he participated in a Dungeons & Dragons tournament, against members of the Quest Club Gaming Organization, at the Magic Castle in Hollywood, California. Lillard has also played Dungeons & Dragons with the online series Dice, Camera, Action with Christopher Perkins as the Dungeon Master; as well as with the Critical Role cast at a special one-shot with Sam Riegel as the Dungeon Master.

Filmography

Film

Television

Video games

Awards and nominations

References

External links

 
 

1970 births
Living people
20th-century American male actors
21st-century American male actors
American Academy of Dramatic Arts alumni
American male comedians
American male film actors
American male television actors
American male video game actors
American male voice actors
Circle in the Square Theatre School alumni
Film directors from California
Film directors from Michigan
Fullerton College alumni
Male actors from Lansing, Michigan
Male actors from Orange County, California
People from Tustin, California